Esmail Chat (also Romanized as Esmā‘īl Chāt; also known as Bajnak Chāt) is a village in Zarabad-e Sharqi Rural District, Zarabad District, Konarak County, Sistan and Baluchestan Province, Iran. At the 2006 census, its population was 498, in 70 families.

References 

Populated places in Konarak County